Isolation is the near or complete lack of social contact by an individual.

Isolation or isolated may also refer to:

Sociology and psychology
Isolation (health care), various measures taken to prevent contagious diseases from being spread
Isolation ward, a separate ward used to isolate patients with infectious diseases
Isolation (psychology), a defense mechanism in psychoanalytic theory
Emotional isolation, a feeling of isolation despite a functioning social network
Isolation effect, a psychological effect of distinctive items more easily remembered

Mathematics
 Real-root isolation
 Isolation lemma, a technique used to reduce the number of solutions to a computational problem.

Natural sciences
Electrical or galvanic isolation, isolating functional sections of electrical systems to prevent current flowing between them
An isolated system, a system without any external exchange
Isolating language, a type of language with a low morpheme-per-word ratio
Isolation (database systems), how and when the changes made by one operation become visible to other concurrent operations
Isolation (microbiology) techniques to separate microbes from a sample containing mixtures of microbes
Reproductive isolation in population genetics, prevents members of two different species from producing offspring if they cross or mate
Topographic isolation of a summit, the great circle distance to the nearest point of equal elevation
Vibration isolation, in engineering, the process of isolating an object from the source of vibrations
In electronics, a measure of how well two ports are disconnected in devices such as directional couplers and circulators

Entertainment

In film
Isolation (2005 film), an Irish horror film
Isolation (2009 film), a British documentary film
Isolation (2015 film), a drama film featuring Dominic Purcell, Stephen Lang, and Tricia Helfer

In television
"Isolation" (The Walking Dead), an episode of the television series The Walking Dead

In music
"Isolation", a song by Die Krupps from 1995 album III - Odyssey of the Mind
"Isolation" (Alter Bridge song), 2010
Isolation (Carpathian album), 2008
Isolation (Fear My Thoughts album), 2008
"Isolation" (John Lennon song), 1970
"Isolation" (Joy Division song), 1980
Isolation (Kali Uchis album), 2018
"Isolation" (Kreator song), 1995
Isolation (Toto album), 1984

Other
Isolation (board game), a 1972 board game also published under the titles Isola and Stranded
 Isolation (illusion), an illusion whereby a prop appears to float in space
Isolation (poker), a play specifically for the purpose of making the hand a one-on-one contest with a specific opponent

See also

Biocontainment
Quarantine
Insulation (disambiguation)
Isolate (disambiguation)
Isolator (disambiguation)
Isolationism
Uncontacted peoples, indigenous peoples living in isolation from the external world
Solitary confinement, a special form of imprisonment in which a prisoner is isolated from most or all human contact
Solitude, a state of seclusion or isolation, i.e., lack of contact with people